The 20th Legislative Assembly of Saskatchewan was elected in the Saskatchewan general election held in April 1982. The assembly sat from June 17, 1982, to September 19, 1986. The Progressive Conservative Party led by Grant Devine formed the government. The New Democratic Party (NDP) led by Allan Blakeney formed the official opposition.

Herbert Swan served as speaker for the assembly.

Members of the Assembly 
The following members were elected to the assembly in 1982:

Notes:

Party Standings 

Notes:

By-elections 
By-elections were held to replace members for various reasons:

Notes:

References 

Terms of the Saskatchewan Legislature